Carvers (also known as Carvers Station) is an unincorporated community in Nye County, Nevada, United States. Its zip code is 89045.

History
Carvers was founded by Gerald and Jean Carver. Gerald Carver came to Smoky Valley, Nevada in 1939 and purchased a 300-acre ranch. He later added 640 acres purchased from Mimosa Pittman, widow of Senator Key Pittman. When work began in 1947 on route 8A (now Nevada Route 376) it cut across a corner of their property and the Carvers decided to open a cafe and bar to take advantage of the increased traffic. The Rainbow Ranch Bar and Café opened in April 1948 and was renamed Carvers Station soon after.

Notes 

Unincorporated communities in Nye County, Nevada
Unincorporated communities in Nevada